Shams, an Arabic word meaning sun, may refer to:

Media
 Shams (newspaper), a defunct Saudi newspaper
 Al-Shams (newspaper), a Libyan government newspaper until 2011
 Network for Public Policy Studies, an Iranian website

Places
 Ain Shams, a neighborhood in Cairo, Egypt
 Kafr Shams, a city in southern Syria 
 Majdal Shams, a village in the Golan Heights
 Shams-e Bijar, a village in Gilan Province, Iran
 Shams Abu Dhabi, a real estate development on Al Reem Island, Abu Dhabi, United Arab Emirates
 Shams Solar Power Station, a planned concentrating solar power station in the United Arab Emirates

Other uses
 Shams (deity), a solar deity in the ancient South Arabian religion
 Shams (name), a list of people with the name
 Shams al-Ma'arif, a 13th-century Arabic book
 Ain Shams University, a university located in Cairo, Egypt
 Ash-Shams, the 91st surah of the Quran
 Shams, a kind of decorative pillow
 The Shams, an all-female folk pop trio from New York
 Association Shams, a Tunisian organization for LGBT rights
 Jebel Shams, a mountain in Oman
 Thee Shams, an American garage rock band

See also
 Sham (disambiguation)
 Al-Shams (disambiguation)
 Shamss Ensemble, a music group performing Iranian and Sufi music
 Shamash, the solar deity in ancient Semitic religion
 Shamish, the Sun in Mandaeism